The 2019 Super W season was the second year of the women's Super W rugby union competition held in Australia. A change to the finals format was made in 2019 with an additional playoff match added for the teams which finished second and third in regular season. The 2019 Super W title was won by NSW Waratahs, defeating Queensland by 8–5 in the final.

Teams
Five women's teams again played in the Super W competition. Western Australia's team was rebranded as the RugbyWA Women for 2019, having been named the Western Force Women in 2018.

Regular season

Standings
Completed standings after all rounds:

Results

Round 1

Round 2

Round 3

Round 4

Round 5

Finals
Teams finishing second and third after the round-robin stage met in a playoff to determine which side would progress to the grand final against the first-placed team from the regular season. The grand final winner became the Super W champion.

Playoff

Grand final

See also
 Women's rugby union

References

2019
2019 in Australian rugby union
2019 in women's rugby union
2019 in Australian women's sport